Jack Cosgrove (born 30 July 1994) is a retired Scottish rugby union player playing most recently for Dragons in the Pro14.

Born in Coventry, Cosgrove attended Coundon Court School – alma mater of Scotland international Jim Hamilton – then Hartpury College, before joining Worcester Warriors Academy in 2013. 
In 2015, he signed a two-year deal with Edinburgh until May 2017.

In March 2017, Cosgrove returned south with Bristol Rugby ahead of the 2017-18 Greene King IPA Championship season.

In December 2018, Cosgrove left Bristol by mutual consent to return to Worcester Warriors.

In June 2019, Cosgrove signed a two-year contract for Welsh region Dragons in the Pro14 from the 2019-20 season.

It was announced in December 2019, that Cosgrove had been forced to retire from professional rugby, aged 25, because of a serious eye injury sustained in training.

References

1994 births
Living people
Bristol Bears players
Doncaster Knights players
Rugby union players from Coventry
Scottish rugby union players
Worcester Warriors players
Rugby union props